Bent Inge Johnsen (born 28 January 1972 in Mosjøen) is a Norwegian football player and current coach.

Johnsen was versatile and could play as defender, midfielder and forward.

He started his career with local Mosjøen IL, then joined top-flight team Bodø/Glimt. After 5 years with the club he moved to Norway's top club Rosenborg and made 65 league appearances in 3 years. He then moved to his final club, Odd Grenland and left professional football aged 34.

Johnsen was never capped on any age level, but was an unused substitute for Norway against Trinidad and Tobago in 1995. During his younger days he also played handball for Mosjøen HK and Øyestad IF.

Johnsen took up coaching, first as player-coach of Urædd FK. In 2008 he became assistant manager of Bodø/Glimt, staying for three seasons. He moved to Nittedal and was hired as manager of Eidsvold Turn. After five seasons he took over lowly Gjelleråsen, whom he guided to promotion to the 2018 Norwegian Third Division. He was subsequently hired by ambitious club Lyn, but failed to fulfil the goals of the club. In 2022 he returned to Gjelleråsen.

References 

Rosenborg Web - Former player: Bent Inge Johnsen
VG Nett - Bent Inge Johnsen

1972 births
Living people
People from Vefsn
Sportspeople from Nordland
Norwegian footballers
Association football midfielders
FK Bodø/Glimt players
Rosenborg BK players
Odds BK players
Eliteserien players
Norwegian football managers
Lyn Fotball managers